The 1916 All-Ireland Senior Football Championship was the 30th staging of Ireland's premier Gaelic football knock-out competition. Wexford won the second title of their four-in-a-row.

Results

Connacht Senior Football Championship

Leinster Senior Football Championship

Munster Senior Football Championship

Kerry withdrew from the Munster Championship after this victory.

Ulster Senior Football Championship

All-Ireland Senior Football Championship

Cork made an objection and a replay was ordered.

Championship statistics

Miscellaneous

 Mayo play in their first All Ireland final but are beaten by Wexford.

References